Peter Pospíšil (April 24, 1944 in Bratislava – April 17, 2006 in Bratislava) was a Czechoslovak/Slovak handball player who competed in the 1972 Summer Olympics.

He was part of the Czechoslovak team which won the silver medal at the Munich Games. He played five matches including the final as goalkeeper.

External links
 profile

1944 births
2006 deaths
Czechoslovak male handball players
Slovak male handball players
Olympic handball players of Czechoslovakia
Handball players at the 1972 Summer Olympics
Olympic silver medalists for Czechoslovakia
Olympic medalists in handball
Medalists at the 1972 Summer Olympics
Sportspeople from Bratislava